Carbon dichalcogenides are chemical compounds of carbon and chalcogen elements. They have the general chemical formula CZ2, where Z = O, S, Se, Te.

This includes:

 Carbon dioxide, 
 Carbon disulfide, 
 Carbon diselenide, 
 Carbonyl sulfide, OCS
 Carbonyl selenide, OCSe
 Carbon sulfide selenide, SCSe
 Carbon sulfide telluride, SCTe

Stability
Double bonds between carbon and chalogen elements, C=Z, become weaker the heavier the chalcogen, Z. This trend means carbon dichalcogenides monomers are less stable and more susceptible to polymerisation as Z changes from O to Te. For example,  is stable,  polymerises under extreme conditions,  tends to polymerise, CSeTe is unstable and  does not exist. This trend is an example of the double bond rule.

Bonding
In carbon dichalcogenides, C=O bond lengths are around 1.16 Å, C=S around 1.56 Å, C=Se around 1.70 Å and C=Te around 1.90 Å.

References

Inorganic carbon compounds
Chalcogenides